Cabrera de Mar is a municipality of the comarca of Maresme in Catalonia, Spain.

Apart from the two mentioned, Cabrera de Mar also borders with the municipalities of Cabrils and Argentona.

Population in Cabrera de Mar is quite scattered in several nucleus of different origins. The casc antic (main centre), Agell (also known as Santa Elena d'Agell), Sant Joan de Munt and Mas Terrillo are located inland, whereas Pla de l'Avellà, Costamar and Bonamar are located next to the coast.

The town centre has buildings in a wide range of styles: neoclassical, modernista, noucentista 
and simply eclectic.

Like almost all municipalities of Maresme, Cabrera de Mar has been historically very well connected with the rest of the comarca and with Barcelona thanks to old Camí Ral (Royal Way) (actual N-II main road) and railroad (Barcelona-Mataró railroad route (1848) was the first to be constructed in all the Iberian Peninsula). Communications have been enhanced in recent years with the construction (1969) of the C-32's Barcelona-Mataró section, also the first autopista (highway) to be constructed in all the Iberian Peninsula.

References

Further reading
 Panareda Clopés, Josep Maria; Rios Calvet, Jaume; Rabella Vives, Josep Maria (1989). Guia de Catalunya, Barcelona: Caixa de Catalunya.  .  .

External links 

Official website 
 Government data pages 
Patrimoni històric i artístic de Cabrera de Mar

Municipalities in Maresme
Populated places in Maresme